Iftiqar Rizal (born 12 January 1999) is an Indonesian professional footballer who plays as a defensive midfielder for Liga 2 club Gresik United.

Club career

Persiraja Banda Aceh
He was signed for Persiraja Banda Aceh to play in Liga 1 in the 2021 season. Rizal made his first-team debut on 28 September 2021 as a substitute in a match against Persela Lamongan at the Pakansari Stadium, Cibinong.

Gresik United
Rizal was signed for Gresik United to play in Liga 2 in the 2022–23 season.

Career statistics

Club

Notes

References

External links
 Iftiqar Rizal at Soccerway
 Iftiqar Rizal at Liga Indonesia

1999 births
Living people
Indonesian footballers
Persiraja Banda Aceh players
Association football midfielders
Sportspeople from Aceh